Troy Dean Prater (September 28, 1958 – March 14, 1996) was a professional American football player for the Buffalo Bills and Kansas City Chiefs who played defensive end for seven seasons. Authorities said Prater slipped in the bath tub, suffered a severe blow to the head and was knocked unconscious. His body apparently plugged the drain, causing the tub to fill with water. He may have had an epileptic seizure and been knocked unconscious; his daughter has epilepsy.

References

1958 births
1996 deaths
People from Altus, Oklahoma
Players of American football from Oklahoma
American football defensive ends
Oklahoma State Cowboys football players
Kansas City Chiefs players
Buffalo Bills players
Deaths by drowning in the United States